Solutions for a Small Planet is an album released by Haujobb on Off Beat records in 1996.  It was released in the United States by the distributor Metropolis Records. It has been acclaimed for crossing boundaries of various electronic music genres.

Track listing
"Clockwise"
"Anti/Matter"
"Rising Sun"
"Depths"
"Sub Unit One"
"Journey Ahead"
"Distance"
"Deviation"
"Nature's Interface"
"Sub Unit Two"
"Cleaned Vision"
"The Cage Complex"
"Net Culture"
"Transfer"
"Sub Unit Three"

Keeping with the album's cyber theme, the track "Nature's Interface" features a sample, "Whatever is out here we're gonna be the first humans to see", from the second season Star Trek: The Next Generation episode "Q-Who?", which featured the cybernetic Borg race as adversaries.

The album title is taken from an advertising slogan used by IBM in the mid-1990s.

Members

Daniel Myer
Dejan Samardzic
Andreas Fricke (saxophone on "The Cage Complex")

References

1996 albums
Metropolis Records albums